This is a list of the descendants of Joseph Smith Sr. and Lucy Mack Smith, the founding family of the Latter Day Saint movement.

Joseph Smith Sr. and Lucy Mack Smith

Unnamed son
A first son died in childbirth in 1797 in Tunbridge, VT.

Alvin Smith

Hyrum Smith

Sophronia Smith

Joseph Smith Jr.

Samuel H. Smith

Ephraim Smith

William Smith

Katharine Smith

Don Carlos Smith

Lucy Smith

See also
Smith family (Latter Day Saints)

References 

Smith
Smith

Smith, Joseph Sr. and Lucy Mack Smith